Senthooram is a 1998 Tamil-language drama film directed by Sangaman. The film stars newcomer Moorthy and Devayani, with Prakash Raj, Raadhika, R. Sundarrajan, Vaiyapuri and Jeeva playing supporting roles. It was released on 11 September 1998.

Plot

The story begins with Kattaalai (Moorthy) serving his sentence in jail and he remembers his past.

In the past, Kattaalai was a mentally ill man and he dreamed about getting married, but the villagers took advantage of his innocence. Muthu Manikkam (Prakash Raj) was a respected village chief married to Devaatha (Raadhika) but they didn't have children.

Megala (Devayani), also known as Otta Rosa, was an innocent village girl who was rejected in her village, so she came to Muthu Manikkam's village. In the past, her mother was a stage dancer. When her mother fell ill, she had to become a stage dancer and she was one day raped by a rich landlord. Her mother later died.

Muthu Manikkam accommodated her in one of his houses and fed her. Soon, Muthu Manikkam had an eye on her. He went to her house the night whenever he wanted. The rumour abounded that Muthu Manikkam and Otta Rosa had an affair. Later, Kattaalai's wedding was cancelled when the bride's family came to know about his illness. So Otta Rosa decided to marry Kattaalai. The young couple lived happily but Muthu Manikkam became wicked towards them. Meanwhile, Devaatha became pregnant. What transpires later forms the crux of the story.

Cast

Dhakshnamoorthy as Kattaalai
Devayani as Otta Rosa (Megala)
Prakash Raj as Muthu Manikkam
Raadhika as Devaatha
R. Sundarrajan as Sadayappan
Vaiyapuri
Jeeva as Vaidehi
Anuja as Sivagami, Sadayappan's wife
Thideer Kannaiah
A. Pazhani
Vetri
Vellai Subbaiah
Manager Cheena
MLA Thangaraj
Madurai Paneer
Gemini Sridhar
Vandikaran Prakash
Amirthalingam
Govindacharya
Vijayamma
Premi
Vadhana
R. K. Raani
Subbulakshmi
K. Meena

Production
Prakash Raj's role was initially offered to actor Manivannan, who turned down the film citing date issues.

Soundtrack

The film score and the soundtrack were composed by Ilaiyaraaja. The soundtrack, released in 1998, features 6 tracks with lyrics written by Vaali, Pulamaipithan and Gangai Amaran.

References

1998 films
1990s Tamil-language films
Films scored by Ilaiyaraaja